André M. J. Gh. Flahaut (born 18 August 1955) is a Belgian politician, then in the province of Brabant and now in the province of Walloon Brabant. Flahaut studied political sciences and public administration at the Université Libre de Bruxelles.

Political career
Flahaut was born in Walhain. He joined the Socialist Party in 1973. From 1989 to 1995 he served in various posts in the administration of Walloon Brabant. He has served in the local council of Walhain, in the provincial council of Walloon Brabant and as deputy governor of Walloon Brabant. Since 12 July 1999 he has served as Minister of Defence in both governments of Guy Verhofstadt, Verhofstadt I (1999–2003) and Verhofstadt II (2003–2007).

In 2009, he demanded the recall of the Belgian ambassador to the Holy See after controversy over comments by Pope Benedict XVI, who claimed that condoms promoted AIDS. Flahaut commented, "The comments made by the pope, who is a head of state, are sufficiently grave, inappropriate, and inadmissible that we should mark, in a symbolic but very strong fashion, our displeasure and disapproval."
 
From 20 July 2010 through 30 June 2014, he was President of the Belgian Chamber of Representatives. Flahaut is the current Minister of Budget in the Government of the French Community.

Anti-semitic charges and subsequent lawsuit
Because of charges of antisemitism brought by the Coordinating Committee of Jewish Organizations in Belgium (CCOJB) and Joël Rubinfeld, André Flahaut decided to lodge a complaint of defamation in June 2008, demanding €25000 in damages and official apology. The tribunal of first instance of Brussels in a verdict returned in October 2009 agreed with Flahaut on an apology, but not on the damages. The CCOJB and Joël Rubinfeld appealed the decision. 

New Comité de coordination des organisations juives de Belgique (CCOJB) leader Professor Maurice Sosnowski commented on the lawsuit: “Rubinfeld was right to accuse Flahaut and right to appeal the first circuit's sentence, but a reasonable compromise is better than a long and uncertain procedure.”

Honours
 2014 : Knight Grand Cross in the Order of Leopold II.

References

External links

 
 Details

|-

|-

1955 births
Living people
Belgian Ministers of State
Socialist Party (Belgium) politicians
People from Walhain
Presidents of the Chamber of Representatives (Belgium)
Recipients of the Grand Cross of the Order of Leopold II
Belgian Ministers of Defence
21st-century Belgian politicians